Xixuthrus domingoensis is a species of beetle in the family Cerambycidae. It has also been classified in the genus Mecosarthron, but this assignment has been challenged, with evidence both for and against the placement of this species in the genus Xixuthrus, which is otherwise restricted to the Old World.

References

Prioninae